Hope Macaulay (born 26 April 1996) is a Northern Ireland fashion and textiles designer, creative director and founder of the contemporary luxury fashion brand Hope Macaulay.

Career 
Macaulay graduated from the UK-based University for the Creative Arts in Fashion Textiles: Print in 2018. In the same year she showed her graduate collection at London's Graduate Fashion Week  and in London Fashion Week

In 2018, she launched her namesake brand Hope Macaulay. She is most well known for her "kaleidoscopic knitwear and fantasy prints". She was listed in the Irish Times as ‘Top 50 People to Watch in 2019’ and spotlighted by Elle magazine  and Vanity Fair Italia  in 2020. Macaulay's handmade-to-order garments have been featured in British Vogues “Best Street Style at London Fashion Week” and have been worn by Irish actress Bronagh Waugh and Grammy nominated singer and songwriter, Halsey

In May 2020, Vogue magazine featured Hope Macaulay as "an independent craft-led label you need to know about now".

Personal life 
Macaulay was born in Magherafelt in 1996 and grew up in Portstewart  in Northern Ireland, where her studio is based. Her father is the writer Tony Macaulay.

References

External links 

 Official Website

1996 births
Living people
British fashion designers